Maina may refer to:
Maina (Cook Islands), an island in the Aitutaki group of the Cook Islands
Maina, Goa, a village in India
Maina, Iran, a village in Razavi Khorasan Province, Iran
Maina people, the Mainan linguistic group, ranging along the north bank of the Marañón River in South America.
Maina Kaderi, a Village Development Committee in Saptari District in the Sagarmatha Zone of south-eastern Nepal
Maina (name)
Maina Sahasrabahu, a Village Development Committee in Saptari District in the Sagarmatha Zone of south-eastern Nepal
Maïna, a Canadian drama film released in 2013

See also
Mani Peninsula, a Greek peninsula
Mayna (disambiguation)
Myna bird
Mynaa, a Tamil film
Villamaina, an Italian municipality